Mrs. Harris Goes to Paris is a 2022 historical comedy-drama film directed and produced by Anthony Fabian, from a screenplay he co-wrote with Carroll Cartwright, Keith Thompson, and Olivia Hetreed. It is the third film adaptation of the 1958 novel Mrs. 'Arris Goes to Paris by Paul Gallico. The film stars Lesley Manville, Isabelle Huppert, Lambert Wilson, Alba Baptista, Lucas Bravo, Ellen Thomas, Rose Williams, and Jason Isaacs. The film enjoyed strong box office success in the United States arthouse circuit. Manville received a nomination for the Golden Globe Award for Best Actress in a Motion Picture – Comedy or Musical for her performance. The film also received a nomination for the Academy Award for Best Costume Design and the BAFTA Award for Best Costume Design.

Plot
In 1957 London, Mrs. Ada Harris, a widowed cleaning lady, becomes obsessed with one client's haute couture Dior dress; it inspires an ambition to buy her own Dior dress. After unexpectedly receiving a war-widow's pension, she travels to Paris to do so. She stumbles into a showing of Dior's 10th anniversary collection and is befriended by André, the Dior accountant, and Natasha, a Dior model. However, the Dior director, Claudine, resents Ada's intrusion into the exclusive world of haute couture.

Dior has fallen on hard financial times and, because Ada will pay in cash, they reluctantly agree to make her a dress. While in Paris for fittings, she stays with André and encourages him to express his affection for Natashawho shares his interest in existential philosophy.

When Claudine is forced to sack several Dior workers for financial reasons, Ada organises a strike and forces Claudine and Christian Dior to hear André's ideas to modernise and make the business profitable.

Ada returns to London with her dress. She lends it to her client, Pamela, a struggling actress, who wears it to an event. It catches fire and is ruined. Ada's Dior friends read about the disaster in the newspaper and send her another dress, one she initially coveted more than the purchased one.

Cast

Production
In October 2020, it was announced that Lesley Manville, Isabelle Huppert, Jason Isaacs, Lambert Wilson, Alba Baptista and Lucas Bravo had joined the cast of the film, with Anthony Fabian directing and producing the film, from a screenplay he co-wrote alongside Caroll Cartwright, Keith Thompson and Olivia Hetreed, based upon the novel Mrs. 'Arris Goes to Paris by Paul Gallico. Manville was set to be the executive producer.

Principal photography began in October 2020. Filming took place over 40 days in Budapest, before production moved to London and Paris.

Release
In March 2021, Focus Features acquired worldwide distribution rights to Mrs. Harris Goes to Paris for approximately $15 million and distributed the film in the United States, while parent company Universal Pictures distributed it internationally. It
was released theatrically in the United States on 15 July 2022, though it was originally scheduled to be released on 6 May. The film was released in the United Kingdom on 30 September 2022, in Hungary on 6 October 2022, and in France on 2 November 2022.

The film was released for VOD platforms on August 2, 2022, followed by a Blu-ray and DVD release on September 6, 2022.

Reception

Box office
In the United States, the film made $2 million from 980 theaters in its opening weekend; 44% of its audience were women over the age of 55. The film eventually grossed more than $10 million in the United States theatrically. Deadline Hollywood described the film's box office performance as "strong."

Critical response

  Audiences polled by CinemaScore gave the film an average grade of "A" on an A+ to F scale.

Accolades

References

External links
 

2022 films
2022 comedy-drama films
2022 multilingual films
2020s British films
2020s English-language films
2020s French films
2020s French-language films
2020s historical comedy-drama films
British historical comedy-drama films
British multilingual films
English-language French films
English-language Hungarian films
Entertainment One films
Films about fashion in France
Films about dresses
Films based on American novels
Films based on works by Paul Gallico
Films set in 1957
Films set in London
Films set in Paris
Films shot in Budapest
Films shot in London
Films shot in Paris
Focus Features films
French historical comedy-drama films
French multilingual films
Hungarian comedy-drama films
Hungarian historical comedy films
Hungarian historical drama films
Hungarian multilingual films
Universal Pictures films